David Boman (February 2, 1888 – December 10, 1956) was a Swedish politician from Mörlunda, Kalmar. He was a member of the Centre Party. Boman was a member of the Swedish parliament (lower chamber) where he represented the Stockholm constituency between 1945 and 1952.

References 

 
 

Members of the Riksdag from the Centre Party (Sweden)
1888 births
1956 deaths
Members of the Andra kammaren
People from Kalmar County
20th-century Swedish politicians